Hydroxypropyl starch is a type of modified starch used as a food additive.  I has the E number E1440. Hydroxyl propyl starch is not absorbed intact by the gut, but are significantly hydrolyzed by intestinal enzymes and then fermented by intestinal microbiota.

References

E-number additives
Starch